Pascal Plamondon (born 12 December 1992) is a weightlifter competing for Canada. He won a bronze medal in the 85 kg competition with a total lift of 333 kg at the 2014 Commonwealth Games in Glasgow.

References

1992 births
Living people
Canadian male weightlifters
Sportspeople from Sherbrooke
Weightlifters at the 2014 Commonwealth Games
Olympic weightlifters of Canada
Commonwealth Games bronze medallists for Canada
Weightlifters at the 2016 Summer Olympics
Commonwealth Games medallists in weightlifting
Weightlifters at the 2015 Pan American Games
Pan American Games competitors for Canada
20th-century Canadian people
21st-century Canadian people
Medallists at the 2014 Commonwealth Games